No Escape is an album by the Marc Tanner Band which includes the single "Elena". It was released on the Electra label in 1979.

Background 
The album made its appearance in early 1979, released on Elektra 6E-168. It was produced by Nat Jeffrey and Glen Spreen. The ten songs on the album were written by Marc Tanner. Some of them were co-composed by Nat Jeffrey and Sal Marquez. Billboard picked the best songs as "Elena", "She's So High", "In A Spotlight" and "Edge Of Love". One of the musicians to play on the album was William "Smitty" Smith who was with the 1960s group Motherlode. Two well known musicians on the album were Vanetta Fields and Richie Zito.

It was re-released on CD through Wounded Bird Records in 2006.

Promotion 
Around April, the Marc Tanner Band featuring Linda Stanley performed 9 songs from the album at the Golden Bear in Huntington Beach, California. In May, Elektra/Asylum were wrapping up a promo for the album which was a blanket marketing strategy for another single from the album, "Never Again". 10,000 tie clips in the form of handcuffs were distributed to radio and retail outlets. There were also requests from non-music outlets in the L.A area such as restaurant staff and nightclubs for the items.

Reception
For the week ending March 3, 1979, it entered the Billboard album chart at 160. By April 21, at its 8th week in the chart, it had fallen to 185.

Track listing

Personnel
Adapted from AllMusic.

 Michael Baird – drums
 Ben Benay – guitar
 Rosemary Butler – vocals, background vocals
 Dan Dugmore – steel guitar, Lap steel guitar, Pedal steel guitar
 Venetta Fields – vocals, background vocals
 Mike Finnigan – vocals, background vocals
 Bob Glaub – bass
 Jay Graydon – guitar
 Max Gronenthal – vocals, background vocals
 Jim Horn – flute
 Nat Jeffrey – composer, producer
 Steve Lukather – guitar
 Gary Mallaber – drums
 David Paich – keyboards, piano
 David Piet – bass
 Jeff Porcaro – drums
 Bryan Savage – saxophone
 William D. "Smitty" Smith – clavinet, Fender Rhodes, keyboards, piano, background vocals, Wurlitzer
 Glen Spreen – ARP synthesizer, bass, keyboards, Moog bass, Moog synthesizer, organ, piano, Wurlitzer
 Marc Tanner – guitar, background vocals
 Joe Turano – vocals, background vocals
 Tommy Vig – percussion
 Richie Zito – guitar

Release history

References 

1979 debut albums
Marc Tanner Band albums
Elektra Records albums